Sankaty Head Golf Club is one of the easternmost golf courses in Massachusetts, perched on the edge of Nantucket Island in Siasconset, Massachusetts. The course was designed by Emerson Armstrong and opened in 1923. It is an 18-hole course. It is one of the few examples of world-class links-style golf outside of the UK (see Shinnecock Hills). The Atlantic wraps around 270 degrees of the layout and the Sankaty Head Lighthouse looms over the front nine.

Sankaty members are a driving force behind the Francis Ouimet Scholarship Fund. They also have successfully sustained one of the few remaining caddy camps in the world, Camp Sankaty Head, which has existed since the late 1930s. Membership is private. Famous members include Jack Welch (whose island residence is just off the 4th tee-box), Lawrence Bossidy, Robert Charles Wright, Harry Fraker, Amos Hostetter Jr., Henry C. Pfaff, and Bill Belichick.

On June 4, 2019, the Sankaty Head Golf Club was chosen to be the host site of the USGA's 41st U.S. Mid-Amateur. This was their first hosted USGA championship and was played September 25–30, 2021.

The Caddy Camp 
The Sankaty Head Caddy Camp, directed by Dave Hinman, is the last remaining caddy camp in the United States and one of the last in the world. Here, 60 caddies, 6 junior staff  members, a program director, caddymaster, camp director, assistant camp director, and cook are located between the 11th and 13th fairways on the course. After being picked through an application process, caddies come to this camp from Iowa, Florida, New York, South Carolina, Maine, New Jersey and other states.

There are three "huts" in the camp, with 20 boys in each. Other buildings in camp include a mess hall, recreational hall, library, laundry shack, staff hut, and the director's hut. While the boys are not caddying, they can enjoy organized team sports of softball, volleyball, football, basketball, and of course, golf. Also in their free time, the boys can enjoy recreational golf, a workout in the weight "pit", or a game of ping pong in the rec hall.

On August 2, 2011, a fire at the caddy camp erupted during a propane delivery. The fire consumed three buildings and injured the driver of the propane tanker truck.

Scorecard

Source:

See also 
 Siasconset Golf Club
 Miacomet Golf Course

References

External links
Official Sankaty Head Golf Club website
Official Sankaty Head Caddie Camp website
Massachusetts Golf Association Member Page
Course Review
When Did Golfing Begin on Nantucket?

1923 establishments in Massachusetts
Golf clubs and courses in Massachusetts
Buildings and structures in Nantucket, Massachusetts
Sports venues completed in 1923
Tourist attractions in Nantucket, Massachusetts